Hubert Pallhuber (born 17 September 1965) is an Italian former professional mountain biker.

At the 1997 UCI Mountain Bike World Championships Pallhuber won the world championship in the men's cross-country event. He is the brother of Wilfried Pallhuber.

Pallhuber also represented Italy at the Olympic Games.

His brother Wilfried competed as a professional biathlete.

References

Living people
Italian male cyclists
Italian mountain bikers
Cross-country mountain bikers
Cyclists at the 2000 Summer Olympics
Olympic cyclists of Italy
1965 births
Sportspeople from Bruneck
UCI Mountain Bike World Champions (men)
Cyclists from Trentino-Alto Adige/Südtirol